Georgia Makhlouf is a Lebanese writer in the French language, an editor and literary critic. She is a winner of the Prix Léopold Sedar Senghor and the Prix Ulysse.

Life and career
Georgia Makhlouf was born in Lebanon. At the age of 20, during the Lebanese civil war, she left for Paris. At university, she worked on a thesis focussing on ideology in modern Lebanese children's literature.

Makhlouf is an editor of L'Orient littéraire as well as a contributor to the literary supplement of the Lebanese daily L'Orient-Le Jour. She also writes interviews and articles for Huffington Post.

In 2014, Makhlouf published her first novel, Les absents. This was awarded the ninth Léopold Sedar Senghor prize for debut novel. It also won the Prix Ulysse of the Arte Mare festival.

Makhlouf founded Kitabat, an association to promote writing workshops in Lebanon. She lives in Paris.

Selected works
  (France-Liban prize)
  (Phénix prize) 
  (Léopold Sedar Senghor prize)

References

External links
 

Year of birth missing (living people)
Living people
21st-century Lebanese writers 
21st-century Lebanese women writers
Lebanese journalists
Lebanese novelists